Canh Nậu may refer to several places in Vietnam, including:

 , a rural commune of Thạch Thất District.
 Canh Nậu, Bắc Giang, a rural commune of Yên Thế District.